The Weekly West was an American newspaper founded by twenty-two-year-old Frances Marion Posegate in St. Joseph, Missouri.  In 1859 it was expanded to a daily paper.  In August, 1860 Posegate sold the paper to James Tracey & Co.

It contains a first hand account of the start of the Pony Express:

The Weekly West
St. Joseph, Missouri, Saturday Morning, April 7, 1860
THE GREATEST ENTERPRISE OF MODERN TIMES!!

At a quarter past seven o'clock, last evening, the mail was placed by M. Jeff. Thompson, on the back of the animal, a fine bay mare, who is to run the first stage of the great through Express from St. Joseph to her sister cities of the Pacific shore. Horse and rider started off amid the loud and continuous cheers of the assembled multitude, all anxious to witness every particular of the inauguration of this greatest enterprise which it has as yet become duty, as a public journalist, to chronicle. The rider is a Mr. Richardson, formerly a sailor, and a man accustomed to every description of hardship, having sailed for years amid the snows and icebergs of the Northern ocean. He was to ride last night the first stage of forty miles, changing horses once, in five hours; and before this paragraph meets the eyes of our readers, the various dispatches contained in the saddlebags, which left here at dark last evening, will have reached the town of Marysville, on the Big Blue, one hundred and twelve miles distant-an enterprise never before accomplished even in this proverbially fast portion of the country.

Previous to the starting of the mail, and while the crowd were anxiously waiting, brief and appropriate addresses were delivered by Mssrs. Majors of the Express Company, Mayor M. Jeff. Thompson, and others, setting fourth the advantages to be derived by the country generally and our city in particular, from this magnificent undertaking, characteristic of the energy and enterprise of those representative men of the great West, Messrs. Majors, Russell, Waddell & Jones. This is but a precursor as Mr. Majors justly remarked, of another, a more important, and greater enterprise, which must soon reach its culmination, viz: the construction of the road upon which the tireless iron horse will start on his long overland journey, opening up as he goes the rich meadows of nature, the fertile valleys, and crowning the eminences of the rocky range with evidence of civilization and man's irresistible mania of progression; diversifying the prairies with lowing cattle herds, and making them lovelier by the dwellings of the pioneer, cheered in his western pilgrimage by the loved ones of his household, and aided by the fair hands and bright eyes of woman. Of a truth "the desert shall blossom as the rose".

The messenger from New York with the through dispatches, left that city on Saturday morning; but was detained twenty-four hours in Detroit, reaching this city at five o'clock last evening, via the Palmyra Branch and Hannibal and St. Joseph Railroad, making the distance from the Mississippi to the Missouri in the unprecedented time of four hours and fifty one minutes, including stoppages. The train consisted only of only the engine and one passenger car, running something over forty miles an hour, the distance being stated as two hundred and eight miles. This we may venture to assert, is better time than has ever before been made on a Western railroad, at all events.

The extension of the St. Louis, St. Joseph, and Salt Lake telegraph line will further facilitate this undertaking, bringing us even nearer our brethren to the west of the Sierra Nevada, until, at no far distant day, we shall have a continuous electric chain from one Ocean to the other. And the transmission of intelligence will be almost instantaneous. A proud era it will be for journalism, when the papers of the southern and eastern cities are enabled to publish important events of the Golden State simultaneously with its own journals; and when we here on the banks of the Missouri, intermediate, will made aware of the fluctuations of the markets, lucky strikes in the mines, and of disastrous fires ere the ruins have ceased to smoke.

The Eastward express, we understand, will leave San Francisco today, and we will expect its arrival in twelve days at furthest. We shall regard the arrival of this express as by far the most important event which has occurred since the settlement of our city, and would suggest that a suitable and appropriate demonstration be gotten up to testify our appreciation of the enterprise which has conceived and this far successfully carried out the undertaking.

External links
Kansas Historical Quarterly
Pony Express Newspapers

Defunct newspapers published in Missouri
Works about the Pony Express